Rahimabad (also Romanized as Raḩīmābād) is a village in Fareghan Rural District, Fareghan District, Hajjiabad County, Hormozgan Province, Iran. For the 2006 census, its population was 180 from 44 families.

References 

Populated places in Hajjiabad County